Ralph de Sempringham (also Sempryngham, Semplyngham, or Sempyngham) was an English medieval churchman,  theologist, university chancellor, and dean.

Between 1252 and 1255, Ralph de Sempringham was Chancellor of Oxford University. In 1254, he was elected Dean of Lichfield.

See also
 Sempringham

References

Year of birth unknown
Year of death unknown
English Roman Catholic theologians
Chancellors of the University of Oxford
Deans of Lichfield
13th-century English people
13th-century Roman Catholics